KWNR (95.5 MHz "95.5 The Bull") is a commercial FM radio station licensed to Henderson, Nevada, and broadcasting to the Las Vegas Valley.  KWNR airs a country music radio format and is owned by iHeartMedia, Inc.  The radio studios and offices are on Freemont Street in Las Vegas, a mile west of the Strip.  On weekdays, KWNR carries two nationally syndicated country music programs, "The Bobby Bones Show" in morning drive time and "After Midnite with Granger Smith" heard overnight.  

KWNR has an effective radiated power (ERP) of 100,000 watts, currently the maximum for FM stations.  The transmitter is on Black Mountain in Henderson.  KWNR broadcasts using HD Radio technology.  The HD-2 digital subchannel plays classic country music.  The HD-3 subchannel carries a Regional Mexican format known as "La Campensina 96.7" which feeds FM translator K244EX at 96.7 MHz.

History
KWNR has been a country station in the Las Vegas area since 1990.

It was a non-commercial, non-profit Christian radio station known as KILA. When KILA moved to another frequency in 1985, the short-lived KYYX 95.5 FM began. It was a country station designed to compete with country music leader KFMS 101.9 FM.

KYYX floundered after two years. 95.5 switched to Hot Adult Contemporary KLSQ (Q95) in 1987.

In 1989, the station switched its call sign to KWNR and was known as "Winner 95.5". "Winner 95.5" lasted about a year before switching to "New Country 95.5" in September 1990.

In 2004, "New Country" was dropped and the station was known as 95.5 KWNR. The "New Country" label came back in the summer of 2006. Streaming began November 17, 2005.

On September 20, 2013, KWNR rebranded as "95.5 The Bull".

References

External links
Official Website

WNR
Country radio stations in the United States
WNR
Radio stations established in 1972
1972 establishments in Nevada
IHeartMedia radio stations